City Lights was a Canadian television series hosted by Brian Linehan and produced by Citytv in Toronto, and syndicated throughout Canada and internationally, running from 1973 to 1988. It featured Linehan interviewing film and television celebrities about their roles and lives. Linehan developed a reputation for well-researched questions and non-adversarial style.

In 1988, the series was replaced with MovieTelevision, an expanded magazine series cohosted by Linehan and Jeanne Beker. Linehan remained with the new show for a single season before leaving in 1989.

References

1973 Canadian television series debuts
1988 Canadian television series endings
Citytv original programming
1970s Canadian television talk shows
1980s Canadian television talk shows

External links